Pyramidelloides is a genus of minute, ectoparasitic  sea snails, marine gastropod mollusks or micromollusks in the family Eulimidae.

Species
Species within the genus Pyramidelloides include:
 Pyramidelloides angulatus (Jickeli, 1882)
 Pyramidelloides angustus (Hedley, 1898)
 Pyramidelloides barbadensis Moolenbeek & Faber, 1992
 Pyramidelloides carinatus (Mörch, 1876)
 Pyramidelloides glaber Faber, 1990
 Pyramidelloides gracilis (Garrett, 1873)
 Pyramidelloides mirandus (A. Adams, 1861)
 Pyramidelloides multicostatus Faber, 1990
 Pyramidelloides tosaensis Habe, 1961
Species brought into synonymy
 Pyramidelloides baculumpastoris (Melvill & Standen, 1896): synonym of Teretianax baculumpastoris (Melvill & Standen, 1896)
 Pyramidelloides cylindrica Laseron, 1956: synonym of Pyramidelloides mirandus (A. Adams, 1861)
 Pyramidelloides letsonae (Pilsbry, 1918): synonym of Chrystella suta (Pilsbry, 1918)
 Pyramidelloides minutus (Turton, 1932): synonym of Teretianax minuta (W. H. Turton, 1932)
 Pyramidelloides pacifica Laseron, 1956: synonym of Pyramidelloides mirandus (A. Adams, 1861)
 Pyramidelloides pagoda (Powell, 1926): synonym of Teretianax pagoda Powell, 1926
 Pyramidelloides suta (Pilsbry, 1918): synonym of Chrystella suta (Pilsbry, 1918)
 Pyramidelloides suteri (Oliver, 1915): synonym of Teretianax suteri (W. R. B. Oliver, 1915)
 Pyramidelloides triliratus (de Folin, 1873): synonym of Teretianax trilirata (de Folin, 1873)
 Pyramidelloides turris Laseron, 1956: synonym of Pyramidelloides mirandus (A. Adams, 1861)
 Pyramidelloides viticula Laseron, 1956: synonym of Pandalosia viticula (Laseron, 1956) (original combination)

References

 Nevill, G. 1885. Hand List of Mollusca in the Indian Museum, Calcutta. Part 2. Gastropoda. Calcutta : Government 
 Printer pp. 1–306. [73, 95] [Original rank: subgenus [of Rissoina]. Transferred to Eulimidae by Warén, 1983, Zoologica Scripta, 12(4): 273, 289
 Iredale, T. 1918. Molluscan nomenclatural problems and solutions-No. 1. Proceedings of the Malacological Society of London 13: 28-40
 Warén A. (1983) An anatomical description of Eulima bilineata Alder with remarks on and a revision of Pyramidelloides Nevill (Mollusca, Prosobranchia, Eulimidae). Zoologica Scripta 12(4): 273-294.

Eulimidae